Kyle James Kozub Mooney (born September 4, 1984) is an American actor, comedian, writer, producer, and singer. Mooney is best known for his tenure as a cast member on the NBC sketch comedy series Saturday Night Live from 2013 to 2022. He co-wrote and starred in the film Brigsby Bear, in addition to co-creating, co-writing, producing, and starring in the adult cartoon comedy Saturday Morning All Star Hits!.

Mooney's work has appeared on a number of shows, including his man-on-the-street interviews, which were featured on Jimmy Kimmel Live! and Sports Show with Norm Macdonald. Mooney has been a regular writer and performer at the acclaimed Upright Citizens Brigade since 2007. He has starred in a number of recurring TV roles, such as Rory on the HBO comedy series Hello Ladies and as Murphy Brown Fünke in Arrested Development.

Early life
Mooney was born the youngest in a family of three boys in San Diego, California, to parents Linda (née Kozub) and Brian Mooney. Linda is a former reporter for The San Diego Union-Tribune, and Brian is an environmental consultant and planner. Mooney has two older brothers, Sean and Ryan. Mooney is left-handed and nearsighted.

Mooney's Marshall Middle School class chose him as the most likely to become a television star. He graduated from Scripps Ranch High School in 2003, where he won Best Actor as Prospero in Shakespeare's The Tempest and was hailed as class clown. Mooney studied film at the University of Southern California. There, he performed improv and sketch comedy with collegiate group Commedus Interruptus. After a six-week audition process in 2003, the three new members added to Commedus were Kyle Mooney, Beck Bennett, and Nick Rutherford. Mooney graduated from USC in 2007 from the USC School of Cinematic Arts.

Mooney is a self-described collector and owns a VHS collection that he started working on as a child. Through connections made while working on SNL, Mooney has been able to get his VHS tapes autographed by the actors who have starred in them. For example, Mooney owns a Beetlejuice VHS that was signed by both Michael Keaton and Alec Baldwin.

Career

Good Neighbor
In 2007, Mooney, Bennett, and Rutherford came together to form the sketch comedy group Good Neighbor, along with Mooney's friend, director and editor Dave McCary. Bennett and McCary joined Mooney on SNL in 2013 (as a performer and director, respectively), and Rutherford was hired as a writer the following year. In 2014, Good Neighbor was featured on NewMediaRockstars' Top 100 Channels, ranked at No. 98.

Saturday Night Live
He auditioned to join SNL in the summer of 2012 but was rejected; he auditioned the next season and was accepted. On September 28, 2013, Kyle Mooney made his debut on Saturday Night Live as a featured player. At the start of the forty-first season, Mooney was upgraded to repertory status.

Mooney brought some of his YouTube characters to SNL, including his person-on-the-street interviews, the 4/20 Weed-Smoking Guy, Chris Fitzpatrick, Todd from Inside SoCal, and Bruce Chandling.

His celebrity impressions on Saturday Night Live include Jim Acosta, Woody Allen, Criss Angel, Fred Astaire, David Axelrod, Jeff Bezos, Neil Cavuto, Lincoln Chafee, Bradley Cooper, Tom Cotton, Johnny Depp, Michael Jackson, Bruce Jessen, Steve Jobs, John Kennedy, Chris Kirkpatrick, Joey Lawrence, Macklemore, Howie Mandel, Chuck Norris, Rand Paul, Pope Francis, Axl Rose, Skrillex, Stephen Stills, and Steven Tyler. He departed the series after season 47, ending a nine-season run.

YouTube
Mooney started his personal YouTube channel (called "kyle") in September 2005, where he posted short comedy sketches. He was also a member of the channel GoodNeighborStuff, along with Beck Bennett, Nick Rutherford and Dave McCary.

Other work
Mooney starred in and co-wrote the film Brigsby Bear, which premiered in 2017 at the Sundance Film Festival. He co-wrote the film with Kevin Costello over a two to three-year period, drawing inspiration from his own life, his interest in 1980s children's television shows and cartoons, and his experience making short films with Costello and McCary in middle school. Dave McCary directed the film.

In December 2021, the adult cartoon comedy Saturday Morning All Star Hits!, co-created, co-written, and executive produced by Mooney, was released on Netflix. He also stars in several roles. The eight-episode series is directed by Dave McCary and animated by Ben Jones. Mooney and Jones created the show based on a mutual love of Saturday-morning cartoon blocks from their childhoods in the 1980s and 1990s.

Personal life
In 2021, Mooney married actress Kate Lyn Sheil.

Filmography

Film

Television

Web series and shorts

Bibliography

References

External links

1984 births
Living people
American male film actors
American male television actors
American male voice actors
American television writers
American male television writers
Male actors from San Diego
21st-century American male actors
USC School of Cinematic Arts alumni
American impressionists (entertainers)
American sketch comedians
American male comedians
American male writers
Writers from San Diego
Comedians from California
Screenwriters from California
21st-century American comedians
21st-century American screenwriters
The New Yorker people
21st-century American male writers
Upright Citizens Brigade Theater performers